Erythroxylum (Erythroxylon) is a genus of tropical flowering plants in the family Erythroxylaceae. Many of the approximately 200 species contain the substance cocaine, and two of the species within this genus, Erythroxylum coca and Erythroxylum novogranatense, both native to South America, are the main commercial source of cocaine and of the mild stimulant coca tea. Another species, Erythroxylum vaccinifolium (also known as catuaba) is used as an aphrodisiac in Brazilian drinks and herbal medicine.

Erythroxylum species are food sources for the larvae of some butterflies and moths, including several  Morpho species and Dalcera abrasa, which has been recorded on E. deciduum, and the species of Agrias.

Species

, Kew's Plants of the World Online listed 259 species:

References

 
Malpighiales genera